The 1988–89 Edmonton Oilers season was the Oilers' tenth season in the NHL, and they were coming off a Stanley Cup championship after defeating the Boston Bruins the previous season, which was their fourth Stanley Cup in the past 5 seasons.  The Oilers finished third in the Smythe Division with 84 points, their lowest point total since the 1980–81 season. For the eighth consecutive season, the Oilers had five 30-goal scorers.

Prior to the season, the Oilers was involved in one of the biggest trades in NHL history, dealing Wayne Gretzky, Marty McSorley and Mike Krushelnyski to the Los Angeles Kings in exchange for Jimmy Carson, Martin Gelinas, the Kings first round draft picks in 1989, 1991 and 1993, and $15 million.

Jari Kurri led the club with 102 points, while Jimmy Carson scored a team high 49 goals, and Mark Messier had a team best 61 assists. Charlie Huddy led the defense with 44 points, while Kelly Buchberger provided the team toughness, leading the Oilers with 234 penalty minutes.

In goal, Grant Fuhr got the majority of the starts, leading the team with 23 wins, while Bill Ranford had a team best 3.50 GAA.

The Oilers finished the regular season first in short-handed goals scored, with 27.

In the playoffs, the Oilers faced Wayne Gretzky and the Los Angeles Kings in the opening round of the playoffs. The heavily-favored Oilers took a 3–1 series lead, however, the Kings responded by winning 3 games in a row by a combined score of 16–6 to win the series, ending the Oilers bid at winning a third straight Stanley Cup. It marked the first time since 1982 that Edmonton had lost in the first round of the playoffs, ironically it was the Kings who eliminated them in the opening round that year.

Season standings

Schedule and results

Playoffs

Los Angeles Kings 4, Edmonton Oilers 3

Season stats

Scoring leaders

Goaltending

Playoff stats

Scoring leaders

Goaltending

Awards and Records

Awards

Records

Milestones

Transactions

Trades

Free agents

Draft picks
Edmonton's draft picks at the 1988 NHL Entry Draft

References

External links
 SHRP Sports
 The Internet Hockey Database
 National Hockey League Guide & Record Book 2007

Edmonton Oilers season, 1988-89
Edmon
Edmonton Oilers seasons
National Hockey League All-Star Game hosts